Awa Traoré (born 13 October 2000) is a Malian footballer who plays as a forward for Malian Women's Championship club AS Mandé and the Mali women's national team.

Club career
Traoré has played for Mandé in Mali, appearing at the 2021 CAF Women's Champions League final tournament.

International career
Traoré capped for Mali at senior level during the 2021 Aisha Buhari Cup.

References

External links

2000 births
Living people
Malian women's footballers
Women's association football forwards
Mali women's international footballers